Hey Ho may refer to:

Music

Albums
Hey Ho (What You Do to Me!), by Chad Allan and the Expressions, 1965
Hey! Ho! Let's Go: The Anthology, by Ramones

Songs
"Hey Ho" (Gin Wigmore song), 2010
"Hey Ho, What You Do to Me", a 1965 song by The Guess Who
"Hey Ho", by Ludacris from the album Battle of the Sexes
"Hey Ho!", by Lust (Lords of Acid album)
"Hey Ho Hey Ho ...", by The Blow Parade
"(Hey Ho) Move Your Body", by Gibson Brothers
"Hey - Ho", by The Beachcombers
"Hey Ho", by Sebastian

See also
"Hey Joe", a popular rock standard from the 1960s, first performed by the Leaves, notably covered by The Jimi Hendrix Experience
"Ho Hey", a song by The Lumineers